Reunion in Rhythm (also known as Our Gang Follies of 1937) is a 1937 Our Gang short comedy film directed by Gordon Douglas. It was the 150th Our Gang short (151st episode and 62nd talking episode) that was released.

Plot
A follow-up to the musical-revue short Our Gang Follies of 1936, the one-reel Reunion in Rhythm was apparently filmed under the title Our Gang Follies of 1937. Its release title reflected the fact that, in addition to such current Gang members as Spanky, Alfalfa, Darla, Buckwheat, and Porky, the film also features return appearances by former "Our Gang" stalwarts Mickey Daniels, Mary Kornman, Joe Cobb and Mathew "Stymie" Beard.

The occasion is a class reunion at Adams Street Grammar School, where the students stage a show for the entertainment of the alumni. A running gag has Buckwheat attempting to recite "Little Jack Horner" (unannounced), as Spanky tries to keep him offstage. Musical highlights include "Baby Face", performed by Darla and Porky; and "Broadway Rhythm", performed by Spanky and the ensemble; and a medley of "Going Hollywood" (from Bing Crosby's 1933 musical of the same name) and "I'm Through With Love", sung by Alfalfa and Georgia Jean LaRue.

Cast

The Gang
 Darla Hood as Darla
 Eugene Lee as Porky
 George McFarland as Spanky
 Carl Switzer as Alfalfa
 Billie Thomas as Buckwheat
 Georgia Jean LaRue as Georgia
 Pete the Pup as himself

Our Gang graduates
 Matthew Beard as Stymie
 Joe Cobb as Joe
 Mickey Daniels as Mickey Daniels
 Mary Kornman as Mary

Additional cast
 Rosina Lawrence - Miss Lawrence, the teacher
 Ernie Alexander - Band leader

Additional kids
Barbara Bletcher, Daniel Boone, Gloria Brown, John Collum, Barbara Goodrich, Paul Hilton, Sidney Kibrick, Elaine Merk, Harold Switzer

See also
 Our Gang filmography

References

External links

1937 films
1937 comedy films
1937 short films
American black-and-white films
Films directed by Gordon Douglas
Metro-Goldwyn-Mayer short films
Our Gang films
1930s American films